"When I Call Your Name" is a song co-written and recorded by American country music artist Vince Gill.  It was released in May 1990 as the third single and title track from the album When I Call Your Name.  The song reached number 2 on the Billboard Hot Country Singles & Tracks chart.  It was written by Gill and Tim DuBois. Patty Loveless performed backing vocals on the song. Session veteran Barry Beckett played piano on the track. The Common Linnets performed a cover of the song to celebrate 50 years of the CMA Awards.

Music video
The music video was directed by Bill Pope and premiered in mid-1990. Although Patty Loveless sang the song with Gill in live performances, she did not appear in the video. Instead, country singer Matraca Berg appeared, lip-syncing to Loveless's vocals.

Chart performance

Year-end charts

References

1990 singles
Vince Gill songs
Songs written by Tim DuBois
Songs written by Vince Gill
Song recordings produced by Tony Brown (record producer)
MCA Records singles
1989 songs